Hannah Botha (17 January 1923, in Dwarsderbos – 16 April 2007, in Johannesburg) was a South African TV and film actress known for roles in Nommer Asseblief, Agter Elke Man and most recently the soap-opera Egoli: Place of Gold. She did not become a full-time actress until 1988, before then she worked at the Legal Department of the Receiver of Revenue. She died in Johannesburg of possible heart failure in 2007 and her last episode on Egoli was dedicated to her.

Web sources 

Hannah married John Sams and had five children, Alicia age 15, Daivon age 13, Annina age 10, Carimme age 5 and Ammim 3.

South African television actresses
1923 births
2007 deaths